Beyram (also Romanized as Bairam and Beyrom) is a city and capital of Beyram District, in Larestan County, Fars Province, Iran.  At the 2006 census, its population was 6,520, in 1,469 families.

References

Populated places in Larestan County
Cities in Fars Province